During the 1996–97 English football season, Barnsley F.C. competed in the Football League First Division.

Season summary
Manager Danny Wilson successfully acquired a number of signings in the summer that were to play huge roles, amongst these were the vastly experienced duo Neil Thompson and Paul Wilkinson, as well as youngster Matty Appleby.

Oakwell also gained an international flavour, as Jovo Bosančić and Trinidad and Tobago international Clint Marcelle were to sign, with Marcelle's work permit clearing just a couple of days prior to the Red's first game of the season, an away match at West Bromwich Albion. Marcelle was cleared to play and scored the opening goal of the season in a 2–1 victory. Barnsley went on to equal their best start to a season by winning the next four games. Wilson then further improved the team by bringing in Scottish forward John Hendrie, who had partnered Wilkinson at Middlesbrough.

Bolton Wanderers looked increasingly likely to win the league as the season progressed, the Reds played both games against the Trotters relatively early on in the season, with the two games both resulting in 2–2 draws. As the season neared its closing stages, it looked as if either Barnsley or Mark McGhee's Wolverhampton Wanderers would join Bolton.

In Barnsley's final home game of the season, a Yorkshire derby against Bradford City, the team knew a win would be enough to secure promotion to the top tier of English football for the first time in the club's history. The side dominated the game, but led only 1–0 at half time thanks to a Wilkinson goal. With only a few minutes remaining, Clint Marcelle, the man who had scored the opening goal of the season scored the Red's final goal at home. As the final whistle blew, the fans swarmed onto the pitch amid jubilant celebrations.

The team lost their final game of the season 5–1 away at Oxford United; however the joy of promotion remained throughout the summer and the team later had an open-top bus celebration around the town, culminating at the town hall.

Final league table

Results
Barnsley's score comes first

Legend

Football League First Division

FA Cup

League Cup

Squad

References

Barnsley F.C. seasons
Barnsley